The Screen Award for Best Comedian is chosen by a distinguished panel of judges from the Indian Bollywood film industry and the winners are announced in January. The award was further extended when they included a separate female category for performance in a comedian role, although this was only given once in 1996.

Winners

See also
 Screen Awards
 Bollywood
 Cinema of India

Screen Awards